Píntame (Paint Me) is the second studio album by Elvis Crespo. This album received the Grammy Award for Best Merengue Album and a Premio Lo Nuestro award for "Tropical Album of the Year". This is also the theme for the 1999 Venezuelan telenovela Carita Pintada.

Track listing
 "Píntame"
 "Besos De Coral"
 "Ven"
 "Solo Me Miro"
 "Si Tu Te Alejas"
 "Dame Carino"
 "Enamorado De Ti"
 "Por El Caminito"
 "No Comprendo"
 "Vuelve Conmigo"
 "Eres Tu"
 "Tiemblo"
 "Mas Que Una Caricia"
 "Pequeño Luis"

Charts

Sales and certifications

See also
List of number-one Billboard Top Latin Albums of 1999
List of number-one Billboard Tropical Albums from the 1990s

References

Elvis Crespo albums
1999 albums
Sony Discos albums